The Tetela people (or Batetela in the plural) are an ethnic group of the Democratic Republic of the Congo, most of whom speak the Tetela language.

Description
The Batetela live in the region between Lusambo and the Upper Congo River, in the provinces of Sankuru and Maniema.  They live by hunter gathering, fishing, farming and raising cassava, banana and kola nuts.  They are related to the Kusu people, only separating from them in the late 1800s after the arrival of Arabs and Belgians in the region.  Both the Batetela and the Kusu are subgroups of the larger Mongo group.  The name Motetela comes from a god named Motetela, meaning either "he who laughs not" or "he at whom one may not laugh."

Like congolese Bantu groups, the Tetela have a large and colorful set of proverbs that are used for a wide variety of purposes, from rebuking to encouraging, usually by adults.

History
According to Emil Torday (who studied the tribes of the Congo between 1908 and 1909), the Batetela originated on the right bank of the Lomami River and migrated to their present territory at some unknown date.  In 1869–70, some Tetela groups came into contact with Tippu Tip, an Arab slave trader from Zanzibar.  Following this, the chieftain Gongo Lutete began working with Tip and the Arabs to lead the Batetela in slave raids against the Luba people in Kasai.  In the Congo Arab war of 1892–1894, the Batetela fought for the Arabs, but later defected to the Belgians.  Gongo Lutete was executed by the Belgians in 1893, however, and this caused the Batetela to revolt in 1895 in the first of the Batetela Rebellions.  Successive uprisings followed, lasting until 1908.

During the period immediately following independence, Patrice Lumumba, a Tetela, was a prominent politician and the first Prime Minister of the Democratic Republic of the Congo before his assassination in 1961.  In 1975, many Batetela were purged from the military.

Music
"Three types of drum are used by the Batetela, a Bantu tribe situated between the Lomami River and the Sankuru River in the Kasai Province of central Belgian Congo. The ngomo skin drum is used for dancing, usually accompanying the lukumbi, the six-toned slit drum. The ekuli, a small cylindrical two-toned drum, formerly used to signal victory in battle, is now used to call people to church and classes. The lukumbi is the most interesting and intricate of the three, and constitutes a highly developed poetic and musical art form as well as a means of communication".

Notes

References

 
Ethnic groups in the Democratic Republic of the Congo
Bantu peoples